Dragan Kapičić (born 7 August 1948) is a retired Serbian professional basketball player and executive.

Club career
Kapičić played with Crvena zvezda, in his hometown of Belgrade, in the Yugoslav First Federal League, from 1965 to 1977. His teammates were Zoran Slavnić, Ljubodrag Simonović, Dragiša Vučinić, and Vladimir Cvetković among others. With them, he won two Yugoslav National League championships, three Yugoslav National Cup titles, and one European-wide secondary level FIBA European Cup Winners' Cup (later called FIBA Saporta Cup) championship. He is Crvena zvezda's all-time club leader in total points scored.

In the late stage of his club career, he played with Saturn Köln of the German League.

National team career 
Kapičić played in 169 games with the senior Yugoslavian national team. He represented Yugoslavia at the 1972 Munich Summer Olympics. With Yugoslavia, he won gold medals at the 1970 FIBA World Championship, and the 1975 EuroBasket.

Post-playing career 
Kapičić was the President of the Basketball Federation of Serbia, from April 2007 to April 2011.

Personal life
Kapičić is the son of Jovo Kapičić (1919‒2013), who was a Yugoslav People's Army General and recipient of the Order of the People's Hero. He married Slobodanka "Beba" Žugić, a Montenegrin actress. The couple have two sons.

His son Stefan (born 1978), is an actor that is best known for playing his role of Colossus in Deadpool (2016) and Deadpool 2 (2018). In the 2015 Serbian sports drama We Will Be the World Champions, Kapičić is portrayed by his son Stefan.

Career achievements 
 FIBA European Cup Winners' Cup (FIBA Saporta Cup) champion: 1 (with Crvena zvezda: 1973–74)
 Yugoslav League champion: 2 (with Crvena zvezda: 1968–69, 1971–72)
 German League champion: 1 (with Saturn Köln: 1980–81)
 Yugoslav Cup winner: 3 (with Crvena zvezda: 1970–71, 1972–73, 1974–75)

See also 
 KK Crvena zvezda accomplishments and records
 List of KK Crvena zvezda players with 100 games played
 Yugoslav First Federal Basketball League career stats leaders

References

External links
FIBA Profile
FIBA Europe Profile
Sportski spomenar

1948 births
Living people
Basketball players from Belgrade
Basketball players at the 1972 Summer Olympics
BSC Saturn Köln players
FIBA World Championship-winning players
KK Crvena Zvezda executives
KK Crvena zvezda players
Olympic basketball players of Yugoslavia
Serbian basketball executives and administrators
Serbian expatriate basketball people in Germany
Serbian men's basketball players
Serbian people of Montenegrin descent
Small forwards
Yugoslav men's basketball players
1970 FIBA World Championship players
1974 FIBA World Championship players